Broken Highway is a 1993 Australian drama film directed by Laurie McInnes. It was entered into the 1993 Cannes Film Festival.

Cast
 Aden Young as Angel
 David Field as Tatts
 Bill Hunter as Wilson
 Claudia Karvan as Catherine
 Norman Kaye as Elias Kidd
 William McInnes as Roger
 Stephen Davis as Jack
 Dennis Miller as Max O'Donnell
 Kris McQuade as Woman

Production
Laurie McInnes made the short film Palisade which won the Palme d'Or at Cannes. She got development money from the Australian Film Commission to write a script. The film was shot from 25 May to 10 July 1992.

Box office
Broken Highway grossed $18,300 at the box office in Australia.

See also
Cinema of Australia

References

External links

Broken Highway at Oz Movies

1993 films
1993 drama films
1993 independent films
1990s English-language films
Australian drama films
Australian independent films
Australian black-and-white films
Films set in Queensland
Films shot in Brisbane
1990s Australian films